This is the electoral history of Eric Garcetti, the 42nd and current Mayor of Los Angeles. He was previously a member of the Los Angeles City Council for the 13th district.

City Council

Mayor of Los Angeles

2013

2017

References

Garcetti, Eric
Eric Garcetti